McGinty is a surname of Irish origin. Notable people with the surname include:

Adam McGinty (born 1971), Australian cricketer
Anne McGinty (born 1945), American flautist, composer and music publisher
Billy McGinty (rugby league), Scottish rugby league player
Billy McGinty (cowboy) (1871–1961), American cowboy
Brian McGinty (born 1976), Scottish footballer
Damian McGinty (born 1992), Irish actor and singer
Derek McGinty (born 1959), American news anchor and television journalist
Doris Evans McGinty (died 2005), American musicologist
Garnie W. McGinty (1900–1984), American historian
Ian McGinty (born 1985), American comics artist
Jim McGinty (born 1949), Australian politician 
Joe McGinty, American keyboardist
John J. McGinty III (born 1940), United States Marine Corps officer
Kathleen McGinty, American environmentalist
Laurie McGinty (1921–1991), Australian politician
Mick McGinty (died 2021), American artist
Sean McGinty (born 1993), English-Irish footballer
Thom McGinty (1952–1995), Scottish-Irish actor and mime
Thomas Joseph McGinty, American mobster